The following is a collection of the Tasmania cricket team's first-class records. They are an Australian state cricket side. The Tasmania cricket team played the first ever first-class cricket match in Australia.

Tasmania cricket team first-class records

Highest team totals

Highest team totals against

Lowest team totals

Lowest team totals against

Greatest win margins (by innings)

Greatest win margins (by runs)

* 2012–13 Sheffield Shield Final

Individual records

Most matches played

Most catches (fielder)

Most dismissals

Batting records

Highest individual scores

Most career runs

Most runs in a season

Highest batting averages

Most centuries

Partnership records

Bowling records

Most career wickets

Most wickets in a season

Best career average

Best figures in an innings

Best figures in a match

Tasmania first-class cricket records
Records